is a Japanese footballer who has played for Verspah Oita, in the Japan Football League.

Club statistics
Updated to 23 February 2017.

References

External links

Profile at Kataller Toyama

1994 births
Living people
Momoyama Gakuin University alumni
Association football people from Wakayama Prefecture
Japanese footballers
J3 League players
Japan Football League players
Kataller Toyama players
Verspah Oita players
Association football forwards